Daraoun is a village, part of Harissa-Daraoun municipality, located in the Keserwan District of the  Keserwan-Jbeil Governorate in Lebanon.

History
Ottoman tax records indicate Daraoun had seven Christian households and three Christian bachelors in 1523, sixteen Muslim households and one imam in 1530, and ten Christian households and three Christian bachelors in 1543. Sons or descendants of Abu Nawfal, the 17th-century head of the Khazen family, settled to some extent in Daraoun. 

In 1838, Eli Smith noted  Der'an as a village located in "Aklim el-Kesrawan, Northeast of Beirut; the chief seat of the Maronites".

References

Bibliography

 

Populated places in Keserwan District